Gary Michael Seitz (born 1943) is an American mathematician, a Fellow of the American Mathematical Society and a College of Arts and Sciences Distinguished Professor Emeritus in Mathematics at the University of Oregon. He received his Ph.D. from the University of Oregon in 1968, where his adviser was Charles W. Curtis. Seitz specializes in the study of algebraic and finite groups. Seitz has been active in the effort to exploit the relationship between algebraic groups and the finite groups of Lie type, in order to study the structure and representations of groups in the latter class. Such information is important in its own right, but was also critical in the classification of the finite simple groups, a major achievement of 20th century mathematics. Seitz made contributions to the classification of finite simple groups, such as those containing standard subgroups of Lie type. Following the classification, he pioneered the study of the subgroup structure of simple algebraic groups, and as an application went a long way towards solving the maximal subgroup problem for finite groups. For this work he received the Creativity Award from the National Science Foundation in 1991.

Early life
He was born in Santa Monica, California, graduated from University High School in 1961. In high school he was a bowling champion with an average of 194 and a pool shark.

Education and career 
Seitz received his B.A. and Masters at University of California, Berkeley. He went on to earn his Ph.D. at the University of Oregon in 1968. He joined the faculty of the University of Illinois at Chicago in 1968. In 1970, he moved to University of Oregon as assistant professor, where he became a full professor in 1977 and a CAS Distinguished Professor in 2000. In his tenure at University of Oregon he also served as the Department Head of Mathematics and Associate Dean for the sciences in the College of Arts and Sciences. He served as thesis advisor for ten PhD students of whom eight currently hold academic positions. He has been visiting professor at the Institute for Advanced Study, California Institute of Technology, Cambridge University, Institut des Hautes Etudes Scientifiques, Imperial College, Tel Aviv University, Utrecht University, Tokyo University, among other institutions. In 2004, about a dozen  mathematicians gathered for an international conference at the University of Oregon to honor his work.

Books 
The maximal subgroups of the classical algebraic groups, AMS Memoirs, 365, (1987), 1–286.
Maximal subgroups of exceptional algebraic groups, AMS Memoirs, 441, (1991), 1–197.
Finite and locally finite groups, NATO ASI Series, (with, B. Hartley, A. Borovik, R. Bryant), Kluwer publishing company, Vol. 471, 1995.
Reductive Subgroups of exceptional algebraic groups, AMS Memoirs, 580, (1996), 1–111. (with Martin Liebeck).
''Selected papers of E. B. Dynkin with commentary", American Mathematical Society, International Press (with, Onischik,Yushkevich), 2000
The maximal subgroups of positive dimension in exceptional algebraic groups, AMS Memoirs, 802, (2004), 1–227. (with Martin Liebeck).
Unipotent and Nilpotent Classes in Simple Algebraic Groups and Lie Algebras, AMS Math. Surveys and Monographs, 180, (2012), 1–380. (with Martin Liebeck).

References

External links
Seitz's webpage at University of Oregon

1943 births
Living people
20th-century American mathematicians
21st-century American mathematicians
Group theorists
University of Oregon alumni
University of Oregon faculty
Fellows of the American Mathematical Society
Institute for Advanced Study visiting scholars